Microsoft Edge is a proprietary, cross-platform web browser created by Microsoft. It was first released in 2015 as part of Windows 10 and Xbox One and later ported to other platforms as a fork of Google's Chromium open-source project: Android and iOS, macOS, older Windows versions (Windows 7, Windows Server 2008 R2 and later), and most recently Linux. It was created as the successor to Internet Explorer (IE).

Edge was initially built with Microsoft's own proprietary browser engine, EdgeHTML, and their Chakra JavaScript engine. In late 2018, it was announced that Edge would be completely rebuilt as a Chromium-based browser with Blink and V8 engines. The new Edge was publicly released in January 2020, and on Xbox platforms in 2021. Microsoft has since terminated security support for the original browser (now referred to as Microsoft Edge Legacy), and in Windows 11 it is the default web browser (for compatibility with Google Chrome).

In May 2022, according to StatCounter, Microsoft Edge became the second most popular browser in the world, overtaking Apple's Safari (in some countries, such as the United States, Edge is the 3rd most popular, where it  has a 14% share, slightly behind Safari's 16% share). , Edge is used by 11 percent of PCs worldwide.

Features
Microsoft Edge is the default web browser on Windows 10, Windows 10 Mobile, Windows 11, Xbox One, and Xbox Series X and Series S consoles, replacing Internet Explorer 11 and Internet Explorer Mobile. As its development and release is dependent on the model of Windows as a service, it is not included in Windows 10 Enterprise Long-Term Servicing Channel (LTSC) builds.

Microsoft initially announced that Edge would support the legacy MSHTML (Trident) browser engine for backward compatibility, but later said that, due to "strong feedback," Edge would use a new engine, while Internet Explorer would continue to provide the legacy engine. The developer toolset of the EdgeHTML-based versions featured an option to emulate the rendering behaviour ("document mode") of Internet Explorer versions 5 to 11.

Favorites, reading list, browsing history and downloads are viewed at the Hub, a sidebar providing functionality similar to Internet Explorer's Downloads manager and Favorites Center.

Edge features a built-in PDF reader, and supports WebAssembly. Until January 2021, Edge also featured an integrated Adobe Flash Player (with an internal whitelist allowing Flash applets on Facebook websites to load automatically, bypassing all other security controls requiring user activation).

Edge does not support legacy technologies such as ActiveX and Browser Helper Objects, instead it uses an extension system.

Internet Explorer 11 remained available alongside Edge on Windows 10 for compatibility until 2023, when it was removed. It remained identical to the Windows 8.1 version and did not use the Edge engine as was previously announced. In Windows 11, Edge became the only browser available from Microsoft. However, it includes an “Internet Explorer mode,” aimed at fixing compatibility issues; it provides the legacy MSHTML browser engine and supports the legacy ActiveX and BHO technologies.

Edge integrates with Microsoft's online platforms to provide voice control, search functionality, and dynamic information related to searches within the address bar. Users can make annotations to web pages that can be stored to and shared with OneDrive, and can save HTML and MHTML pages to their computers. It also integrates with the "Reading List" function and provides a "Reading Mode" that strips unnecessary formatting from pages to improve their legibility. Edge also has a new feature called vertical tabs which allow users to move tabs on the left side of the screen. 

Preliminary support for browser extensions was added in March 2016, with build 14291, three extensions were initially supported. Microsoft indicated that the delay in allowing extensions and the small number was due to security concerns. As of December 2022, there are more than 9,000 extensions—called add-ons—available for Edge.

On February 7, 2023, Microsoft announced a major overhaul to Edge, revamping the user interface with Fluent Design, along with adding Bing Chat button.

HTML5 standards
Edge originally lacked support for open media standards such as WebM and Opus, but these were later added in Edge 14.14291.

, Edge 84 had scored 496/555 on HTML5test.

Release strategy
Microsoft Edge Legacy's release cadence was tied to the Windows 10 release cycle and used the Windows Insider Program to preview new versions of the browser. These pre-release builds were known as "Edge Preview". Every major release of Windows included an updated version of Edge and its render engine.

On April 8, 2019, Microsoft announced the introduction of four preview channels: Canary, Dev, Beta, and Stable and launched the Canary and Dev channels that same day with the first preview builds, for those channels, of the new Edge. Microsoft collectively calls the Canary, Dev, and Beta channels the "Microsoft Edge insider channels". As a result, Edge updates were decoupled from new versions of Windows. Major versions of Edge Stable are now scheduled for release every 4 weeks, closely following Chromium version releases.

Surf (video game)

In May 2020, an update to Microsoft Edge added Surf, a video game where players control a surfer attempting to evade obstacles and collect powerups. Similar to Google Chrome's Dinosaur Game, Surf is accessible from the browser's offline error page and can also be accessed by entering edge://surf into the address bar. The game features three game modes (classic, time trial, and slalom), has character customization, and supports keyboard, mouse, touch, and gamepad controls. Its gameplay has been compared to the 1991 Microsoft video game SkiFree.

In 2021, Surf was updated with limited-time seasonal theming resembling SkiFree. Instead of surfing, the player skis down a mountain while being chased by a yeti.

Development

Edge Legacy (2014–2019)

In December 2014, writing for ZDNet, technology writer Mary Jo Foley reported that Microsoft was developing a new web browser codenamed "Spartan" for Windows 10. She said that "Spartan" would be treated as a new product separate from Internet Explorer, with Internet Explorer 11 retained alongside it for compatibility.

In early January 2015, The Verge obtained further details surrounding "Spartan" from sources close to Microsoft, including reports that it would replace Internet Explorer on both the desktop and mobile versions of Windows 10. Microsoft officially unveiled "Spartan" during a Windows 10-focused keynote on January 21, 2015. It was described as a separate product from Internet Explorer, its final name was not announced.

"Spartan" was first made publicly available as the default browser of Windows 10 Technical Preview build 10049, released on March 30, 2015. The new engine used by "Spartan" was available in Windows 10 builds as part of Internet Explorer 11, Microsoft later announced that Internet Explorer would be deprecated on Windows 10 and would not use the "Spartan" engine.

On April 29, 2015, during the Build Conference keynote, it was announced that "Spartan" would officially be known as Microsoft Edge. The browser's logo and branding were designed to maintain continuity with the branding of Internet Explorer. The Project "Spartan" branding was used in versions released after Build 2015. On June 25, 2015, Microsoft released version 19.10149 for Windows 10 Mobile which included the new brand. On June 28, 2015, version 20.10158 followed for the desktop versions, also including the updated branding. On July 15, 2015, Microsoft released version 20.10240 as the final release to Insiders. The same version was rolled out to consumers on July 29, 2015.

On August 12, 2015, Microsoft started the preview program for the next version of Microsoft Edge. They released version 20.10512 to Mobile users. 6 days later followed by version 20.10525 for desktop users. The preview received multiple updates. On November 5, 2015, Microsoft released version 25.10586 as the final release for Edge's second public release for desktop users. On November 12, 2015, the update was rolled out to both desktop users and Xbox One users as part of the New Xbox Experience Update. On November 18, 2015, the update was to Windows 10 Mobile. Finally, on November 19, 2015, the update was also made available as part of the Windows Server 2016 Technical Preview 4. 

In November 2017, Microsoft released ports of Edge for Android and iOS. The apps feature integration and synchronization with the desktop version on Windows 10 PCs. Due to platform restrictions and other factors, these ports do not use the same layout engine as the desktop version and instead use OS-native WebKit-based engines.

In April 2018, Edge added tab audio muting. In June 2018, support for the Web Authentication specifications were added to Windows Insider builds, with support for Windows Hello and external security tokens.

Microsoft stopped supporting Microsoft Edge Legacy on March 9, 2021. On April 13, 2021, Microsoft released a cumulative monthly security update which replaced Edge Legacy with the new Edge.

EdgeHTML

EdgeHTML is the proprietary browser engine originally developed for Edge. It is a fork of MSHTML (Trident) with all legacy code of older versions of Internet Explorer removed, with the majority of its source code rewritten to support web standards and interoperability with other modern browsers. EdgeHTML is written in C++.

The rendering engine was first released as an experimental option in Internet Explorer 11 as part of the Windows 10 Preview 9926 build.

EdgeHTML is meant to be fully compatible with the WebKit layout engine used by Safari, Chrome, and other browsers. Microsoft stated their original acceptance criteria: "Any Edge–WebKit differences are bugs that we’re interested in fixing."

A review of the engine in the beta Windows 10 build by AnandTech found substantial benchmark improvements over MSHTML (Trident), particularly its new Chakra JavaScript engine performance, which had come up to par with that of Google Chrome. Other benchmarks focusing on the performance of the WebGL API found EdgeHTML to perform much better than Google Chrome and Mozilla Firefox.

New Edge (2019–present)
Codenamed "Anaheim", on December 6, 2018, Microsoft announced its intent to base Edge on the Chromium source code, using the same browser engine as Google Chrome but with enhancements developed by Microsoft. It was also announced that there will be versions of Edge available for Windows 7, Windows 8, and macOS, plus that all versions will be updated on a more frequent basis. According to Microsoft executive Joe Belfiore, the decision for the change came after CEO Satya Nadella told the team in 2017 that the product needed to be better and pushed for replacing its in-house rendering engine with an open source one.

On April 8, 2019, the first builds of the new Edge for Windows were released to the public. On May 20, 2019, the first preview builds of Edge for macOS were released to the public, marking the first time in 13 years that a Microsoft browser was available on the Mac platform. The last time a Microsoft browser was available on the Mac platform was Microsoft Internet Explorer for Mac, which was withdrawn in January 2006.

On June 18, 2019, IAmA post on Reddit, an Edge developer stated that it was theoretically possible for a Linux version to be developed in the future, but no work had actually started on that possibility. On June 19, 2019, Microsoft made Edge available on both Windows 7 and Windows 8 for testing. On August 20, 2019, Microsoft made its first beta build of Edge available for Windows 7, Windows 8, Windows 10 and macOS. August 2019 also saw the removal of support for the EPUB file format. At Microsoft Ignite, Microsoft released an updated version of the Edge logo.

The new Edge was released on January 15, 2020, and was gradually rolled out to all Windows 10 users. The new Edge was also rolled out to Windows 7 and 8.1 users via Windows Update.

On September 22, 2020, Microsoft announced that a beta version of Edge for Linux would be available in preview form in October 2020. This comes after the company announced in November 2019 that a Linux version would be developed and confirmed in May 2020 that the Linux version was in development. The first preview build for Linux was released on October 20, 2020.

Full support for the new Edge on Windows 7 was scheduled to end on January 15, 2022, but was later extended to January 15, 2023.

On April 29, 2022, Microsoft announced integrated VPN support for Microsoft Edge, coming in line with this privacy feature with Chrome and Firefox. There will be a free version of the integrated Edge VPN available but is limited to 1 GB of data transfer.

Performance
Early benchmarks of the EdgeHTML engine—included in the first beta release of Edge in Windows 10 Build 10049—had drastically better JavaScript performance due to the new Chakra than MSHTML (Trident) 7 using the older Chakra in Internet Explorer 11, with similar performance to Google Chrome 41 and Mozilla Firefox 37. In the SunSpider benchmark, Edge performed faster than other browsers, while in other benchmarks it operated slower than Google Chrome, Mozilla Firefox and Opera.

Later benchmarks conducted with the version included in 10122 showed significant performance improvement compared to both IE11 and Edge back in 10049. According to Microsoft's benchmark result, this iteration of Edge performed better than both Chrome and Firefox in Google's Octane 2.0 and Apple's Jetstream benchmark.

In July 2015, Edge scored 377 out of 555 points on the HTML5test. Chrome 44 and Firefox 42 scored 479 and 434 respectively, while Internet Explorer 11 scored 312.

In August 2015, Microsoft released Windows 10 Build 10532 to insiders, which included Edge 21.10532.0. This beta version scored 445 out of 555 points on the HTML5test.

In July 2016, with the release of Windows 10 Build 14390 to insiders, the HTML5 test score of the browser's development version was 460 out of 555 points. Chrome 51 scored 497, Firefox 47 scored 456, and Safari 9.1 scored 370.

Power efficiency
In June 2016, Microsoft published benchmark results to prove the superior power efficiency of Edge in comparison to all other major web browsers. Opera questioned the accuracy and provided their own test results where Opera came out on top. Independent testing by PC World confirmed Microsoft's results. However, tests conducted by Linus Sebastian in June 2017 instead showed that, at that time, Chrome had the best battery performance.

Reception
In an August 2015 review of Windows 10 by Dan Grabham of TechRadar, Microsoft Edge was praised for its performance, despite not being in a feature-complete state at launch. Andrew Cunningham of Ars Technica praised the browser for being "tremendously promising" and "a much better browser than Internet Explorer ever was" but criticized it for its lack of functionality on launch. Thom Holwerda of OSNews criticized Edge in August 2015 for its hidden URL bar, lack of user friendliness, poor design and a tab system that is "so utterly broken it should never have shipped in a final release". He described the browser's implemented features as "some sort of cosmic joke", saying that "infuriating doesn't even begin to describe it".

Data from August 2015, a few weeks after release, showed that user uptake of Edge was low, with only 2% of overall computer users using the new browser. Among Windows 10 users, usage peaked at 20% and then dropped to 14% through August 2015.

In October 2015, a security researcher published a report outlining a bug in Edge's "InPrivate" mode, causing data related to visited sites to still be cached in the user's profile directory, theoretically making it possible for others to determine sites visited. The bug gained mainstream attention in early February 2016, and was fixed with a cumulative update on February 9, 2016.

Microsoft's switch to Blink as Edge's engine has faced mixed reception. The move increases the consistency of web platform compatibility between major browsers. For this reason, the move has attracted criticism, as it reduces diversity in the overall web browser market and increases the influence of Google on the overall browser market by Microsoft ceding its independently developed browser engine.

According to Douglas J. Leith, a computer science professor from Trinity College, Dublin, Microsoft Edge is among the least private browsers. He explained, "from a privacy perspective Microsoft Edge and Yandex are much more worrisome than the other browsers studied. Both send identifiers that are linked to the device hardware and so persist across fresh browser installs and can also be used to link different apps running on the same device. Edge sends the hardware UUID of the device to Microsoft, a strong and enduring identifier than cannot be easily changed or deleted." In response, a spokesperson from Microsoft Edge explained that it uses user diagnostic data to improve the product.

In June 2020, users criticized newly released Windows 7, Windows 8.1, and Windows 10 updates that installed Edge and imported some user data from Chrome and Firefox prior to obtaining user permission. Microsoft responded by stating that if a user rejects giving Edge data import permission, then Edge will delete the imported data. However, if the browser crashes before the user has a chance to reject the import, then the already imported data will not be cleared. The Verge called these "spyware tactics" and called Edge's "first run experience" a "dark pattern".

Microsoft uses proprietary URL handlers in Windows 10 and 11 to redirect URLs accessed via system search functions to Edge, even if the user had not chosen Edge as their default browser. In November 2021, a patch was released to frustrate a workaround employed by the third-party tool "EdgeDeflector", with a Microsoft spokesperson stating that search in the Windows shell is an "end-to-end customer experience" that is not designed to be modified. The developer of EdgeDeflector, Daniel Aleksandersen, called this "clearly a user-hostile move that sees Windows compromise its own product usability in order to make it more difficult to use competing products." In December 2021, it was similarly reported that Microsoft was testing the display of in-browser advertising prompts on the Google Chrome website to discourage downloading the browser.

In November 2021, Microsoft announced that it would display integrated advertising for the buy now, pay later service Zip Pay in Edge during online purchases eligible for financing via the service, and allow users to link their Microsoft account to expedite registration for the service. Microsoft claims that it "does not collect a fee for connecting users to loan providers." This decision was met with criticism from users and the press, arguing that the feature was added bloat.

Market share

According to StatCounter, in August 2019, Edge overtook the market share of Internet Explorer (IE) on PCs, ranking third place at 9.14% and IE in sixth. Mobile versions of Edge exist for Android and iOS, however, they have little to no market share. On Microsoft consoles, Edge replaced IE as the dominant browser a few months after its release in 2015. Market share varies by region. On some days of the week, Edge takes second place with a 10.02% share in the US on PC, and Firefox and Edge have a very similar share globally, switching places for second and third depending on the day. For example, in March 2020, Edge ranked second with a market share of 7.59%, overtaking Firefox, which had 7.19% of the market share.

References

Further reading

External links
 
 Official website for preview builds of Chromium-based Microsoft Edge
 
 
 

 
2015 software
Cross-platform web browsers
Universal Windows Platform apps
Windows 10
Windows components
Windows web browsers
Xbox One software
IOS web browsers
macOS web browsers
Android web browsers
Linux web browsers
Freeware